World Gone Strange is a 1991 solo album by Andy Summers. It was his first solo album which did not involve producer David Hentschel, and the last one recorded for the jazz fusion label Private Music. The title track presents a distinct descending pattern and features a wordless vocal by Summers himself. Summers utilized one of his own mixed media compositions for the cover.

Reception

Allmusic's review of the album consisted of a single sentence fragment: "Not really standard jazz, but some fine playing."

Track listing

Personnel
 Andy Summers – guitar, vocals
 Mitchel Forman – keyboards
 Tony Levin – bass guitar
 Chad Wackerman – drums
 Eliane Elias – piano, vocals (1, 3)
 Bendik Hofseth – soprano saxophone (9)
 Victor Bailey – bass guitar (4, 6)
 Mike Mainieri – marimba (9)
 Manolo Badrena – percussion (1, 3, 9)
 Mino Cinelu – percussion (1, 3, 9)
 Naná Vasconcelos – percussion (9)

Technical
 Mike Mainieri – producer, mixing, engineer
 Garry Rindfuss – engineer, mixing
 Øystein Sevåg – mixing
 Bob Ludwig – mastering

References

1991 albums
Private Music albums
Andy Summers albums